Arthur Carpenter may refer to:
 Arthur Carpenter (furniture maker) (1920–2006), master woodworker and furniture maker
 Arthur W. Carpenter (1891–1981), chemist
 Arthur P. Carpenter (1867–1937), attorney and government official from Vermont
 Buddy Carpenter (Arthur Leroy Carpenter, 1894–1973), American baseball player